Linth was a canton of the Helvetic Republic from 1798 to 1803, consisting of Glarus and its subject County of Werdenberg, the Höfe and March districts of Schwyz and the Züricher subject Lordship of Sax, along with a handful of shared territories.

Administration
The canton contained approximately 78,500 inhabitants. Like all the cantons of the Helvetic Republic, Linth was established and administered on a French Revolutionary model. Linth and was divided administratively into seven districts

 Werdenberg:
capital Werdenberg, 30 electors, approx. 10,500 inhabitants
 Neu St. Johann:
capital Neu St. Johann, 30 electors, approx. 11,600 inhabitants
 Mels:
capital Mels, 25 electors, approx. 9,800 inhabitants
 Schwanden:
capital Schwanden, 29 electors, approx. 10,100 inhabitants
 Glarus:
capital Glarus, 38 electors, 12,700 inhabitants
 Schänis (Gaster):
capital Schänis, 29 electors, 11,900 inhabitants
 Rapperswil:
capital Rapperswil, 29 electors, 11,800 inhabitants

Chronology
The brief tenure of office of the cantonal heads Joachim Heer (1798), Johann Jakob Heussi (1798–99), Felix Christoph Cajetan Fuchs (1799), Niklaus Heer (1799–1802), and Franz Josef Büeler (1802–03) reflected the military and political turmoil plaguing the region, which was under French occupation from 1799, during the War of the Second Coalition, with serious effects on the local economy.

The mainly-Roman Catholic canton acquired a strong aversion to the centralised nature of the government of the Helvetic Republic, even though the canton was mainly composed of territories previously subject to the Old Swiss Confederation, rather than any of the Dreizehn Orte, and even though all citizens of the republic had equal rights. The canton sided only very reluctantly with the French Revolutionary Army. Initial fervour for public education waned as the pressure from the central government was relaxed.

Upper Toggenburg was transferred to the canton of Säntis in 1801, but the canton as a whole existed until the Act of Mediation on March 10, 1803.

References

External links 
 

Canton of Glarus
Cantons of the Helvetic Republic
Former cantons of Switzerland